NSFC may refer to:

 National Natural Science Foundation of China
 National Society of Film Critics
 Newham Sixth Form College
 Newtongrange Star F.C.
 Njube Sundowns F.C.
 Northampton Spencer F.C.
 Northern Saints Football Club
 North Shields F.C.
 Northern Sydney Freight Corridor, a program of works designed to improve the passage of rail freight between the Australian cities of Sydney and Newcastle.